Joseph Philippe Henri Lorenzo Boivin (July 20, 1891 – October 13, 1947) was a Canadian professional ice hockey player. He played with the Quebec Bulldogs of the National Hockey Association.

References

1891 births
1947 deaths
Canadian ice hockey players
Ice hockey people from Quebec City
Quebec Bulldogs (NHA) players